In the United States, the first spouse is the term used to refer to the spouse of a chief executive—that is, of the spouse of the president of the United States (the first lady of the United States and the first gentleman of the United States) and the spouses of the governors of the 50 U.S. states and U.S. territories (Guam, Northern Mariana Islands, Puerto Rico, American Samoa, and the United States Virgin Islands) and the spouse of the mayor of the District of Columbia. (The spouses of many mayors are often called the "first lady" or "first gentleman" of the city as well, and the use of the terms sometimes extends even to the spouses of college presidents).

Since 1985, the National Governors Association has encouraged state first ladies and gentlemen to pursue their own, distinct causes and public agendas. The public role of the first spouse is traditionally ceremonial. Like the first ladies of the United States, state and territorial first spouses are not elected and earn no government salary. However, traditionally first spouses also champion important causes either nationally or within their individual states or territories, such as charitable and humanitarian work. First spouses are often seen as high-profile individuals who can direct public awareness towards a particular cause or campaign. For example, the nation's first spouses launched a nationwide national breast cancer awareness campaign in conjunction with the National Governors Association in 1994. In collaboration with the breast cancer initiative, some first spouses participated in media campaigns, public relations, chaired statewide breast cancer awareness committees, and even spearheaded the creation of a specific women's departments within state health departments. Diverse initiatives championed by individual current first spouses have included advocacy against drunk driving, heart disease in women, the Special Olympics, and development assistance projects in Rwanda.

Most first spouses have pursued their own careers before entering the public arena when their husbands or wives assumed the governor's mansion. For example, Lou Rell, former first gentleman of Connecticut, is a former naval pilot and commercial airline pilot with TWA.

Three states, Alabama, Maine and Massachusetts along with the District of Columbia and Puerto Rico, do not have a first lady or first gentleman.

Current first spouses

United States

States

Territories

See also
List of current United States governors
List of current United States lieutenant governors
List of first gentlemen in the United States

Notes

References

External links
National Governors Association: Biographies of Current U.S. Governors' Spouses

 
 Current first spouses
United States first spouses